Archibald Meserole Bliss (January 25, 1838 – March 19, 1923) was an American politician who served six terms as a member of the United States House of Representatives from New York from 1875 to 1883, and from 1885 to 1889.

Biography
Bliss was born in Brooklyn, New York City and attended the common schools. He married Marie E. Meserale and they had two children.

Career
Between 1864 and 1867 Bliss was an alderman of Brooklyn and served as president of the board of aldermen in 1866. In 1867 he was unsuccessful in his candidacy for mayor, which he ran on the Republican ticket.

Bliss was a delegate to the Republican National Conventions of 1864 and 1868. He was a delegate to the Liberal Republican National Convention in 1872, and to the Democratic National Convention of 1876, 1880, 1884, and 1888. He was a member of the board of water commissioners of Brooklyn in 1871 and 1872. From 1868 until 1878 he was the president and vice-president of the Bushwick Railroad Company. He was also a Director of the New York & Long Island Bridge Company.

Tenure in Congress 
Elected as a Democrat, Bliss was a United States Representative for the Fourth District of New York in the forty-fourth Congress and was re-elected three times, serving from March 4, 1875, to March 3, 1883. He did not stand in 1882 but was elected to the forty-ninth and fiftieth Congresses for the fifth district of New York and served from March 4, 1885, to March 3, 1889. He did not run in 1888.

While in Congress Bliss served as Chairman on the Committee on Pensions. From 1889 until his death, he carried on a real estate business in Washington D. C.

Death
Bliss died in Washington, D.C., on March 19, 1923. He is interred at Cypress Hills Cemetery, Brooklyn, New York.

References

External links

Archibald Meserole Bliss entry at The Political Graveyard

 

1838 births
1923 deaths
Burials at Cypress Hills Cemetery

New York (state) Republicans
People from Brooklyn
Democratic Party members of the United States House of Representatives from New York (state)
Members of the United States House of Representatives from New York (state)